The winner of the women's singles competition received the first official badminton medal in Olympic history.  It was also the first gold medal for Indonesia, which before had only won one silver (in archery).  52 players from 27 nations competed in women's singles.

Draw

First rounds

Section 1

Section 2

Section 3

Section 4

Finals

References

External links 
 Women's singles draws and results at the 1992 Summer Olympics - InternationalBadminton.org

Badminton at the 1992 Summer Olympics
Olymp
Women's events at the 1992 Summer Olympics